Willie D. Hutchinson (April 23, 1921 – October 10, 1992), nicknamed "Ace", was an American Negro league pitcher between 1939 and 1949.

Hutchinson made his Negro leagues debut in 1939 with the Kansas City Monarchs. He played the majority of his career with the Memphis Red Sox, and in his final season of 1949 represented Memphis in the East–West All-Star Game. Hutchinson went on to play in the minor leagues in the early 1950s. He died in Denver, Colorado in 1992 at age 71.

References

External links
 and Seamheads

1921 births
Place of birth missing
1992 deaths
Kansas City Monarchs players
Memphis Red Sox players
20th-century African-American sportspeople
Baseball pitchers